The 2010 Florida A&M Rattlers football team represented Florida A&M University as a member of the Mid-Eastern Athletic Conference (MEAC) during the 2010 NCAA Division I FCS football season. The Rattlers were led by third-year head coach Joe Taylor and played their home games at Bragg Memorial Stadium. They finished the season 8–3 overall and 8–1 in conference play to share the MEAC title with Bethune–Cookman and South Carolina State. However, all of Florida A&M's wins from the 2010 season were later vacated by the NCAA for fielding ineligible students. This was the Rattlers last conference championship before leaving the MEAC in 2020.

Schedule

References

Florida AandM
Florida A&M Rattlers football seasons
Florida AandM Rattlers football